Schillings  (originally Schilling & Lom) is an international reputation and privacy consultancy staffed by reputation, privacy and family lawyers, risk consulting, cyber security and intelligence specialists. The company is an Alternative Business Structure (ABS) and regulated and authorised by the United Kingdom's Solicitors Regulation Authority (SRA). It employs 33 lawyers, risk managers and IT security consultants and offers services covering risk consulting, legal services and IT security.

History 
The firm was founded in 1984 by Keith Schilling and Nicholas Lom and focused largely on media law, libel, and privacy protection. It was called by Index on Censorship as "the scourge of many a Fleet Street editor" for obtaining anonymised gagging orders to protect celebrity clients' privacy. In the early 2010s, the firm began to move away from pure media and libel work towards reputation protection for a largely corporate, non-celebrity clientele.

In 2012 Schillings acquired the information security firm Vigilante Bespoke. In March 2013 the firm was granted two Alternative Business Structure licenses, one for the Schillings partnership and one for Schillings Corporate Limited which owns Vigilante Bespoke.

The company restructured its organisation in September 2013 and is now an integrated legal, risk management, IT security and investigation business.

Notable cases 

In 2004, Schillings helped Lance Armstrong when confronted with doping allegations in the book L. A. Confidentiel, by David Walsh and Pierre Ballester. Schillings was told to tell "every UK paper and broadcaster" to not re-state what was in the book. Gideon Benaim and Matthew Himsworth worked for Schillings on Armstrong's libel actions, including a 2004 defamation suit against The Sunday Times for referencing information in the book.

In May 2008, Keith Schilling won a privacy case in the Court of Appeal for the son of Harry Potter author J. K. Rowling. The case "says children of famous parents have the same right to expect privacy as children of parents who aren't well-known" granting them protection from intrusive photography.

In April and May 2011, Schillings acted for Ryan Giggs in CTB v News Group Newspapers, and obtained a "super-injunction" aimed at preventing the publication by The Sun of the details of an alleged extra-marital relationship between Giggs and Imogen Thomas. The case gained widespread media coverage and political discussion in the UK.

In October 2012 Schillings' family division acted for the respondent husband in reported case BP v KP and NI. The case included not only companies by which one of the spouses was employed but also former colleagues and associates with whom a spouse was professionally acquainted.

In January 2013 Schillings acted for Ned RocknRoll, husband to Kate Winslet. RocknRoll obtained an order preventing the Sun newspaper from publishing private images of RocknRoll taken from a Facebook page.

In May 2013 Schillings Partner Davina Katz (who subsequently founded Katz Partners LLP) acted for Dale Vince who won his appeal against his ex-wife's claim for maintenance. This was viewed as a landmark judgment which set a precedent for future financial claims that may be made many years after a relationship has ended.

In July 2013 Schillings acted for the author JK Rowling who brought proceedings against a lawyer who revealed that she had been writing under a pseudonym.

In 2018, Schillings worked to stop the distribution of the book, Billion Dollar Whale: The Man Who Fooled Wall Street, Hollywood, and the World by Tom Wright and Bradley Hope of The Wall Street Journal in the United Kingdom. The tactics used to disrupt distribution to British booksellers included threatening letters and legal missives. Some book vendors were warned about putting the book into the "True Crime" section of bookstores. The campaign against the publication of the book was unsuccessful and bookstores began selling copies on 12 September 2019.

In 2019, Schillings helped Philip Green in his ultimately unsuccessful attempt to have his name kept from appearing in The Daily Telegraph for his use of NDAs. Mr Justice Warby, presiding in this case, noted  that there had been "an unnecessary degree of partner involvement, and a degree of overmanning that cannot be justified."

In 2019 Schillings represented Meghan, Duchess of Sussex in a High Court claim against The Mail on Sunday over alleged misuse of private information, infringement of copyright and breach of the Data Protection Act 2018. A Mail on Sunday spokesman said the paper stood by the story and would defend the case "vigorously".

Schillings represented Malaysian fugitive Jho Low who was accused by US prosecutors of a money-laundering scheme connected to the 1Malaysia Development Berhad scandal.

Schillings represented Russian oligarch Alisher Usmanov, a long-time Vladimir Putin ally, until he was placed under sanctions by the European Union due to the 2022 Russian invasion of Ukraine.

Partners 
 Founder Keith Schilling was listed as 10th in The Times 100 Most Powerful Lawyers list 2008, and named in the Evening Standards 2008 Survey of the 1000 most influential people in London. In 2013, Schilling was awarded the 'Super Lawyer' leading lawyer accolade.
 Rod Christie Miller spoke to the parliamentary joint committee in 2011 on the draft defamation bill.
 Rachel Atkins acted for Jimmy Nail and Sir Stelios Haji-Ioannou in his libel case against Ryanair's Michael O'Leary.
 Jenny Afia, who was also promoted to partner on 1 January 2012, was named Young Solicitor of the Year at the British Legal Awards 2008.

Former partners 
 Simon Smith, former Schillings managing partner, who has Hollywood actress Keira Knightley, Pam Brighton, Caprice, the Government of Saudi Arabia, Tiger Woods, Rolf Harris and footballer Cristiano Ronaldo among his clients.
 Davina Katz (née Hay) who headed the firm's family division recently left to set up Katz Partners LLP.
 Chris Scott, who was promoted to partner at Schillings in January 2012,[27] was involved with the firm's submission to the Leveson Inquiry. He discussed the effect of the Leveson report's findings on reputation management in The Lawyer.[28] Scott left Schillings to start up reputation management boutique Himsworth Scott.

References

External links 
 The Schillings website
 The Vigilante Bespoke website

Law firms based in London
Law firms established in 1984
1984 establishments in the United Kingdom